Makalu Barun National Park is a national park in the Himalayas of Nepal that was established in 1992 as eastern extension of Sagarmatha National Park. It is the world's only protected area with an elevation gain of more than  enclosing tropical forest as well as snow-capped peaks.

The rugged summits of Makalu, with  the fifth highest mountain of the world, Chamalang, Baruntse and Mera are included in the national park. The national park shares the international border with the Qomolangma National Nature Preserve of the Tibet Autonomous Region in the north.

The protected area is part of the Sacred Himalayan Landscape.

History

In the early- and mid-1980s, personnel of The Mountain Institute (TMI) conducted surveys in the Barun Valley to study the biological richness. The results of these surveys led to interest in creating a new protected area. A respective proposal was formulated in 1985. In 1988, the Makalu-Barun Conservation Area Project (MBNPCA) was initiated as a joint endeavor of the Department of National Parks and Wildlife Conservation and TMI.

The MBNPCA was officially gazetted in 1991. At the time, about 32,000 people resided in the conservation area's 12 Village Development Committees, who are primarily subsistence farmers of Limbu, Sherpa, Yakkha, Gurung, Tamang, Magar, Newar, Brahmin and Chhetri ethnic groups. An innovative community-based conservation approach emphasized management of biodiversity together with local communities. Community Forest User Groups were created with legal rights to use designated forested areas on a sustainable basis. 
Ecotourism was promoted as a way of expanding off-farm employment opportunities for local people while at the same time minimizing negative environmental impact. Hunting and trapping of rare and endangered wild animals is strictly prohibited in the MBNPCA, except in extreme cases of threat to human life. There was also a provision for compensating farmers for crop and livestock depredation caused by endangered species.

In 1999, the conservation area was converted into a buffer zone. Under the Buffer Zone Management Guidelines the conservation of forests, wildlife and cultural resources received top priority, followed by conservation of other natural resources and development of alternative energy.

The inaccessible valleys of the Barun River, the glacier-fed tributary to the Arun River, treasure some of the last remaining pristine forests and alpine meadows. This area has been designated as a Strict Nature Reserve, the first in Nepal, in order to protect natural ecosystems and processes in an undisturbed state for scientific study, environmental monitoring, education and the maintenance of genetic resources.

Climate
The park is located in the eastern climatic zone of the Himalayas, where monsoon  starts in June and eases off in late September. During these months about 70% of the annual precipitation of  falls. The first monsoon clouds reach the area  in April. Temperatures vary greatly due to the extreme difference in altitude in the entire area. Lower elevations are temperate throughout winter and hot during April and May. The tropical and subtropical zones are frost free, with average monthly mean temperatures above .

Vegetation

The Makalu Barun National Park exhibits a high diversity of forest types that are characteristic for the Eastern Himalayas, ranging from near-tropical dipterocarp monsoon forest on  altitude to subalpine conifer stands on  altitude. Forest aspects vary depending on seasonal moisture availability, temperature and snow cover at different elevations and slopes. Forests below  are strongly affected by subsistence agriculture, so that only some ecologically significant stands remain there. Above  forests are usually extensive since the cool, humid climate suppresses agricultural activity. Forests span five bioclimatic zones:
 Tropical – below  with stands of Sal;
On alpine pastures at altitudes above  the religiously important dwarf rhododendron and juniper, aromatic herbs and delicate wildflowers prosper. The region above  comprises mainly rock and ice with little vegetation.

Botanists recorded 3,128 species of flowering plants, including 25 of Nepal's 30 varieties of rhododendron, 48 primroses, 47 orchids, 19 bamboos, 15 oaks, 86 fodder trees and 67 economically valuable aromatic and medicinal plants.

Fauna

The protected area is habitat for a wide diversity of faunal species. There are 315 species of butterflies, 43 species of reptile and 16 species of amphibians. 78 species of fish inhabit the many ponds, lakes and rivers. Ornithologists have recorded 440 bird species, ranging from eagles and other raptors to white-necked storks and brilliantly colored sunbirds. The 16 rare or protected bird species include the rose-ringed parakeet, Blyth's kingfisher, deep-blue kingfisher, blue-naped pitta, pale blue flycatcher, sultan tit, silver-eared mesia, spiny babbler and the white-naped yuhina.

The 88 species of mammals include snow leopard, Indian leopard, clouded leopard, jungle cat, leopard cat, golden jackal, Himalayan wolf, red fox, red panda, black bear, Hanuman langur, Assam macaque, Himalayan tahr, Himalayan goral, muntjac, musk deer, barking deer, Himalayan serow, wild boar, flying squirrel, otters, spotted linsang, weasel and Himalayan marmot.

References

External links 

Eastern Himalayan broadleaf forests
National parks of Nepal
1992 establishments in Nepal